George Michael Hoellering (20 July 1897 – 10 February 1980) was an Austrian film director, producer and cinema manager. He directed Hortobagy (1936) about the Puszta in Hungary, as well as the 1951 British film Murder in the Cathedral, which he co-wrote with T. S. Eliot. He was the director of the Academy Cinema in London's Oxford Street from 1944 until his death in 1980.

Early life
George Hoellering was born as Georg Michael Höllering in Baden, near Vienna, Austria, on 20 July 1897, the third of four children of the musician and impresario, Georg Höllering, and his wife, Maria Magdalene.

Career
From 1919 to 1924 Hoellering was licensee of the Schikaneder Kino in Vienna. At the beginning of the 1920s he moved to Berlin, managed his Vienna cinema from the distance, and worked in the film industry as an editor and director of shorts. He was production manager of Kuhle Wampe (1932), a German film classic, written by Bertolt Brecht. With the approaching Nazi takeover at the end of 1932, Hoellering and his pregnant Jewish wife thought it wise to leave Germany. For a short time they settled in Vienna.

Early in 1934, Hoellering, his family and the cameraman László Schäffer moved to Hungary, to make a film at the famous Puszta of Hortobágy. The film Hortobagy is a docu-fiction, an amalgam of documentary shots with a threefold story-line, which is acted out by peasants and herdsmen. As the Hungarian censors ordered Hortobagy to be cut by more than 10%, in 1936 Hoellering decided to emigrate to England. The London premiere of Hortobagy was set by The Film Society for Sunday 13 December 1936 in the New Gallery Cinema, where the film could be shown without a British license.

Graham Greene wrote about the film in The Spectator: "Undoubtedly, the horses have it. Hortobagy, a film of the Hungarian plains, acted by peasants and shepherds, is one of the most satisfying films I have seen: it belongs to the order of Dovzhenko’s Earth without the taint of propaganda. The photography is extraordinarily beautiful, the cutting superb." And later: "The leaping of the stallions, the foaling of the mares are shown with a frankness devoid of offence and add to the impression that here we are seeing, as far as humanly possible, the whole of a way of life. But we are not asked to admire one way more than another, the horse more than the tractor."

Hoellering became a director of the Academy Cinema in London's Oxford Street where Elsie Cohen was the manager. From 1944 until his death in 1980 he was the manager and part-owner.

In the Summer of 1940 the British authorities arrested and interned all "enemy aliens", including Hoellering, and transported them for several months to the Isle of Man. In the camp there he wrote, organised and directed an amateur theatre production, a musical called "What a Life!" The music, mostly written by fellow inmate Hans Gál, was also played by inmates. During the war years, Hoellering directed several wartime propaganda shorts for different ministries, and Message from Canterbury (1944), a documentary made with the close cooperation of Archbishop William Temple.

His 1950 film, Shapes and Forms is considered to be the first appearance of the Institute of Contemporary Arts (ICA) on film.

He worked for several years on the film version of T.S.Eliot's Murder in the Cathedral, which won two prizes (Best Art Direction and Best Film in Costume) at the Venice International Film Festival, 1951.

Personal life
Hoellering in 1919 married Emma Weidenauer, a German actress, who died in 1927 in cancer.

His second wife, Dora Constance Lehmann, had been previously married and had a son, Ivo Jarosy. She was the daughter of Felix Lehmann and his wife Anna Friedländer. They married in 1929 in Baden, Austria, and their only child, Andrew, was born in Vienna in 1932. Dora died in England in 1955. On 24 November 1956, Hoellering married Anne Allnatt (b. 1925/6) the daughter of Alfred Ernest Allnatt, a building contractor.

Death
He died in Suffolk on 10 February 1980.

Selected filmography
Hunting You (1929), producer
Kuhle Wampe (1932), production manager
Hortobágy (1936), director and producer
Murder in the Cathedral (1951), director, producer, screenwriter and co-editor

World War II newsreel trailers 
Water Saving (1942), director
Water Pipes (1942), director
Eyes on the Target (1942), director
Salvage Saves Shipping (1943), producer
Peak Load (1943), producer
Make Do and Mend Parties (1943), producer
Blood Will Out (1943), director and producer
Skeleton in the Cupboard (1943), director and producer
Blood Will Out (1943), director and producer
Books, Books, Books (1943), director and producer
Old Logs (1943), director and producer
Tim Marches Back (1944), director and producer
Tyre Economy (1944), director and producer
Hands Off (1945), director and producer
Golden Glory (1945), director and producer
Help Wanted (1945), director and producer
Paper Possibilities (1945), director and producer
Family Allowances (1946), director
Briquette Making (1946), director

Shorts 
Message from Canterbury (1944), director, producer and editor
Shapes and Forms (1950), director, producer, screenwriter and editor
Plan for Living (1950), director and producer
Glasgow Orpheus Choir (1951), director, producer, screenwriter and co-editor

References

External links
 Cinema and Poetry: T. S. Eliot’s Murder in the Cathedral
 WW2 newsreel trailers by George Hoellering

1897 births
1980 deaths
Austrian emigrants to the United Kingdom
Austrian film directors
Austrian film producers
People interned in the Isle of Man during World War II